Vladimír Staš (born 19 April 1976) is a Slovak football defender.

External links

at mfkkarvina.cz

References

1976 births
Living people
Slovak footballers
Association football defenders
1. FC Tatran Prešov players
MŠK Žilina players
MFK Karviná players
Partizán Bardejov players
Slovak Super Liga players